Josef "Joe" Zinnbauer (born 1 May 1970) is a German football manager and former player. He played as a midfielder.

Playing career
Zinnbauer retired from playing after suffering a cartilage injury.

Coaching career
Zinnbauer's coaching career started at VfB Oldenburg as head coach in 2005 and was there until 2010. Then he became an assistant coach at Karlsruher SC. He was head coach of Karlsruhe's reserve team from 27 March 2012 to 30 June 2012. He started coaching the reserve team for Hamburger SV on 1 July 2014. in the Regionalliga Nord. The reserve team won 4–0 against Goslarer SC 08 in his first match as a head coach. He led the reserve team to eight wins in eight matches prior to becoming head coach of the first team on 16 September 2014. He replaced Mirko Slomka, who was sacked the previous day. His first match in–charge finished in a 0–0 draw against Bayern Munich. He was sacked on 22 March 2015. Peter Knäbel, the Sports Director for Hamburg, took over for the remainder of the season.

Zinnbauer returned to the reserve team for the 2015/2016 season and was there until he was hired by FC St. Gallen on 15 September 2015.

On 10 December 2019, he was appointed as a head coach of a South African professional football club Orlando Pirates FC , Joe Received Orlando Pirates at 11th Position In ABSA and finished the league in 3rd as an achievement. Exactly a year later in the Premier Soccer League coach Zinnbauer won his first title in South Africa. On 12 December 2020 Orlando Pirates became the champions of the MTN 8, after beating Bloemfontein Celtic in the final 2–1.

On 30 June 2022, Zinnbauer was hired by Lokomotiv Moscow in Russia. He was dismissed on 8 October 2022 following fifth consecutive league loss by Lokomotiv.

Coaching statistics

References

1970 births
Living people
German footballers
Association football midfielders
2. Bundesliga players
SpVgg Bayreuth players
SSV Ulm 1846 players
Karlsruher SC players
1. FSV Mainz 05 players
German football managers
German expatriate football managers
Bundesliga managers
VfB Oldenburg managers
Hamburger SV managers
FC St. Gallen managers
Orlando Pirates F.C. managers
FC Lokomotiv Moscow managers
Premier Soccer League managers
Russian Premier League managers
German expatriate sportspeople in Switzerland
Expatriate football managers in Switzerland
German expatriate sportspeople in South Africa
Expatriate soccer managers in South Africa
German expatriate sportspeople in Russia
Expatriate football managers in Russia